West Jefferson High School, also known as WJHS, and West Jeff is a public high school located in Harvey in unincorporated Jefferson Parish, Louisiana, United States, just outside New Orleans. It was founded in 1955. This is one of the schools in Jefferson Parish that offered the Laptop one to one initiative program.  West Jefferson also offers transportation for students to and from school for free. This is a Title I school  The school was damaged by Hurricane Katrina in 2005.

It serves portions of several communities, including Harvey, Gretna, and Timberlane. All of Terrytown is in the West Jefferson attendance zone.

Enrollment
Students who live outside West Jefferson's specific school district may not be allowed to enroll in this school. West Jefferson has 1,398 students during this school year (2009–2010). Demographics show that the student body consists of 812 African American, 251 Hispanic, 240 Caucasian (non-Hispanic), 87 Asian/Pacific Islander, and 8 American Indian/Alaskan Native students. There are 442 Freshmen (Ninth Graders), 380 Sophomores (Tenth Graders), 290 Juniors (Eleventh Graders), and 286 Seniors (Twelfth Graders). The ratio of gender is approximately 1:1.

Athletics
West Jefferson High athletics competes in the LHSAA.

Championships
Football Championships
(1) State Championship: 1970

Notable alumni
Robert Billiot, member of the Louisiana House of Representatives for Jefferson Parish since 2008
Bianca Del Rio, actor and costume designer; winner of RuPaul's Drag Race season 6
Larry Dodgen, U.S. Army lieutenant general
Parry Nickerson, NFL player
Ricky Templet, former member of the Louisiana House of Representatives 
Rocsi, radio and television host of 106 and Park

References

External links
 West Jefferson High School

Public high schools in Louisiana
Schools in Jefferson Parish, Louisiana
1955 establishments in Louisiana